Bruce "Tog" Tognazzini (born 1945) is an American usability consultant and designer. He is a partner in the Nielsen Norman Group, which specializes in human-computer interaction. He was with Apple Computer for fourteen years, then with Sun Microsystems for four years, then WebMD for another four years.  

He has written two books, Tog on Interface and Tog on Software Design, published by Addison-Wesley, and he publishes the webzine Asktog, with the tagline "Interaction Design Solutions for the Real World".

Background
Tog (as he is widely known in computer circles) built his first electro-mechanical computer in 1957, landing a job in 1959 working with the world's first check-reading computer, NCR's ERMA (Electronic Recording Method of Accounting), at Bank of America, in San Francisco.

Tog was an early and influential employee of Apple Computer, there from 1978 to 1992. In June 1978, Steve Jobs, having seen one of his early programs, The Great American Probability Machine, had Jef Raskin hire him as Apple's first applications software engineer.  He's listed on the back of his book Tog on Interface (Addison Wesley, 1991) as "Apple Employee #66" (the same employee number he held later at WebMD).

In his early days at Apple, simultaneous with his developing Apple's first human interface, for the Apple II computer, he published Super Hi-Res Chess,  a novelty program for the Apple II that, despite its name, did not play chess or have any hi-res (high-resolution) graphics; instead, it seemed to crash to the Applesoft BASIC prompt with an error message, but was actually a parody of Apple's BASIC command line interface that seemingly took over control of one's computer, refusing to give it back until the magic word was discovered.

His extensive work in user-interface testing and design, including publishing the first edition, in September, 1978, and seven subsequent editions of The Apple Human Interface Guidelines, played an important role in the direction of Apple's product line from the early days of Apple into the 1990s. (Steve Smith and Chris Espinosa also played a key role, incorporating the initial material on the Lisa and Macintosh computers in the fourth and fifth editions in the early 1980s.) 

He and his partner, John David Eisenberg, wrote Apple Presents...Apple, the disk that taught new Apple II owners how to use the computer. This disk became a self-fulfilling prophecy: At the time of its authoring, there was no standard Apple II interface. Because new owners were all being taught Tog and David's interface, developers soon began writing to it, aided by Tog's Apple Human Interface Guidelines, and reinforced by AppleWorks, a suite of productivity applications for the Apple II into which Tog had also incorporated the same interface.

Others often report him as one of the fathers of the Macintosh interface, a claim he has always been careful to refute.  Although he did consult with Jef Raskin in the early days of the Macintosh, during the later, critical development period of the Mac, he was assigned to scale down the Lisa interface, not for the Mac, but for the Apple II.  Although he and James Batson were able to develop a viable interface for the Apple II that matched the mousing speed of the much faster Macintosh, the Apple executive staff elected not to ship a mouse with the Apple II for fear of cannibalizing Macintosh sales.

It was only after Steve Jobs' early departure from Apple, in 1985, that Tog came to oversee the interface for both machines. During this period, Tog was responsible for the design of the Macintosh's hierarchical menus and invented time-out dialog boxes, which, after a visible countdown, carry out the default activity without the user explicitly clicking.  He also invented the "package" illusion later used by Apple for Macintosh applications: Applications, along with all their supporting files, reside inside a "package" that, in turn, appears to be the application itself, appearing as an application icon, not as a folder. This illusion makes possible the simple drag-and-drop installation and deletion of Mac applications.

While working at Sun Microsystems, in 1992 and 1993, he produced the Starfire video prototype, in order to give an idea of a usability centered vision of the Office of the future. The video predicted the rise of a new technology that would become known as the World Wide Web. Popular Science Magazine reported, in March 2009, that Microsoft had just produced a new video showing life in the year 2019: "The 2019 Microsoft details with this video is almost identical to the 2004 predicted in this video produced by Sun Microsystems in 1992."

While at Sun Microsystems, Tog also filed for 58 US patents, with 57 issued in the areas of aviation safety, GPS, and human-computer interaction.  Among them is US Patent 6278660, the time-zone-tracking wristwatch with built-in GPS and simple time-zone maps that sets itself using the GPS satellite's atomic clock and re-sets itself automatically whenever crossing into a new time zone.

In 2000, after his four-year stint at WebMD, Tog joined his colleagues as the third principal at the Nielsen Norman Group, along with Jakob Nielsen and Don Norman.

Bibliography
 The Apple Human Interface Guidelines (1987)  (uncredited, author is Apple Computer, Inc)
 Tog on Interface (1992) 
 Tog on Software Design (1995)

References

External links
Ask Tog - Bruce Tognazzini's official site.
The Starfire Home Page, including link to download film

Apple Inc. employees
American people of Swiss descent
Living people
1945 births
People from the San Francisco Bay Area